Mill Point is a hamlet in the Towns of Florida and Glen in Montgomery County, New York, United States. It is located on New York State Route 161 (NY 161).

References

Geography of Montgomery County, New York
Hamlets in Montgomery County, New York